Collagen alpha-1(XV) chain is a protein that in humans is encoded by the COL15A1 gene.

This gene encodes the alpha chain of type XV collagen, a member of the FACIT collagen family (fibril-associated collagens with interrupted helices). Type XV collagen has a wide tissue distribution but the strongest expression is localized to basement membrane zones so it may function to adhere basement membranes to underlying connective tissue stroma. Mouse studies have shown that collagen XV deficiency is associated with muscle and microvessel deterioration.

Type XV collagen is known to be a tumor suppressor that can be used to understand tumor cells environment. Type XV collagen provides the membrane with support and cell anchorage but does not typically have a tight structural network.

Changes of collagen XV can be known to lead to cancer-like behavior in tissues. The loss of collagen XV would no longer provide structural support for the membrane, which can cause tumor cells to invade the basement membrane; prompting possible metastasis. The over expression of collagen XV is known to be found in cervical cancer.

For possible future medical purposes the lack of collagen XV present in tissues can be a means for indication of an invasive tumor.

References

Further reading 

 
 
 
 
 
 
 
 
 
 
 
 

Collagens